Maria Vittoria Sperotto (born 20 November 1996) is an Italian former professional racing cyclist, who last rode for UCI Women's Continental Team . In November 2021, she set a record for the shortest distance ridden in an hour by a female cyclist. Sperotto retired from competition at the end of the 2021 season.

Major results
2015
2nd Scratch Race, 6 giorni delle rose - Fiorenzuola (Under-23)
2017
3rd Scratch Race, GP Zürich - Oerlikon
1st Red Hook Crit Milan

See also
 List of 2016 UCI Women's Teams and riders

References

External links
 

1996 births
Living people
Italian female cyclists
People from Schio
Cyclists from the Province of Vicenza